Guglielmo Gabetto (24 February 1916 – 4 May 1949) was an Italian footballer who played as a striker.

Aside from goalkeeper Alfredo Bodoira, he is the only player to win the Italian championship with both Torino F.C. and cross-city rivals Juventus F.C.

Biography
Gabetto was born in Turin, Italy, in the Aurora district of the Piedmont capital.

He died in a commercial airplane tragedy as one of the victims of the 1949 Superga air disaster, when a plane carrying almost the entire Torino Football Club squad, the Grande Torino, crashed into the Superga hill near Turin. He was buried in the Cimitero Monumentale in Turin.

Club career

Gabetto began his career with Juventus in 1934, scoring 102 goals for the club in seven seasons, 85 of which came in the league; he is still today one of the club's best goalscorers.

In 1941 he was acquired by local rivals Torino, for a notable sum of 330,000 Lit.; the same season, Torino bought two other Juventus players: Felice Borel, and Alfredo Bodoira. He formed a notable attack alongside Ezio Loik and Valentino Mazzola, becoming a key player in the Grande Torino side which dominated Italy, winning five consecutive Serie A titles. Only he and his teammate Piero Operto were originally from Turin. In total, he scored 127 goals for Torino in 225 matches.

International career
Gabetto also made 6 appearances for Italy between 1942 and 1948, scoring 5 goals, the first of which came on his debut against Croatia on 5 April.

Style of play

Regarded as one of the best Italian players of his generation, and one of Italy's greatest ever strikers, Gabetto was a complete, creative, fast, and technically gifted forward, who was known for his flair, co-ordination, speed, and dribbling skills. Nicknamed il barone ("the baron," in Italian), he usually played as a centre-forward, and possessed "acrobatic" characteristics that apparently allowed him to produce "near-impossible" goals. The precision and the power of his kicking made him an impeccable and highly prolific goal-scorer, which made him an idol of the Torino fans, who affectionately called him "Gabe."

Honours

Club
Juventus
Serie A: 1934–35
Coppa Italia: 1937–38
  
Torino
Serie A: 1942–43, 1945–46, 1946–47, 1947–48, 1948–49
Coppa Italia: 1942–43

References

External links

1916 births
1949 deaths
Association football forwards
Footballers from Turin
Footballers killed in the Superga air disaster
Italy international footballers
Juventus F.C. players
Serie A players
Torino F.C. players
Italian footballers